Wistaria or Wisteria is a genus of flowering plants.

Wistaria may also refer to:
 
 Wistaria Provincial Park, British Columbia, Canada
 HMS Wistaria (1915), a Royal Navy

See also
Wisteria (disambiguation)